Kirk Barker (born 26 April 1983) is an English actor.

Beginning his career in stage productions of pantomime, Shakespeare, and musical theatre, he moved on to television work and finally to leading roles in feature films.

Life
Barker grew up in the Calder Valley, attending Stubbings Infant School and Riverside Junior School in Hebden Bridge and then Calder High School, where he took an interest in acting. After leaving school, he was a windsurfing instructor in the summer months and worked in ski chalets in the winter. In his twenties he renewed an interest in acting and musical theatre, beginning to appear in professional stage productions. In 2008 he was Dandini in Cinderella, in 2009 he played Macduff in a Julian Chenery touring production of Macbeth, and in 2010 was Elrond in a tour of The Hobbit directed by Roy Marsden. In 2011 he sang in a travelling production of Footloose by Karen Bruce. In 2012 he had his first screen roles, before spending the second half of the year touring North America in Batman Live. The next year, he secured a regular part in the HBO television series The Girls' Guide to Depravity. In 2015 he starred in the film Arthur and Merlin and later the same year starred opposite Viva Bianca in A Prince for Christmas.

Filmography

Notes

External links
 
 Kirk Barker at Mandy.com

1983 births
Living people
English male stage actors
English film actors
English male musical theatre actors
People from Calderdale (district)